José Balbuena Rodríguez (born February 13, 1918, Lima, Peru - June 22, 2009, Santiago, Chile) was a Peruvian-Chilean footballer who played for clubs in Peru and Chile.

Club career
After became the champion of the 1938 Peruvian Primera División along with Deportivo Municipal, in 1939 he moved to Universidad de Chile, winning the 1940 Primera División de Chile and becoming the sixth foreign top goalscorer for the club.  In addition, he played two matches for Boca Juniors loaned by the Chilean team.

International career
He naturalized Chilean in 1947 and was called up to the Chile national team for the 1947 South American Championship, making an appearance in the match against Ecuador. Prior to this, he represented Chile against Argentina in the second match of the 1941 Copa Presidente de Argentina, scoring a goal at the minute 47.

Personal life
He was nicknamed Cholo, an affectionate form how Chileans refers to the native people from Peru.

Honours
Deportivo Municipal
 Peruvian Primera División (1): 1938 

Universidad de Chile
 Chilean Primera División (1): 1940

References

External links
 José Balbuena at La Historia de Boca Juniors (in Spanish)

1918 births
2009 deaths
Peruvian footballers
Peruvian expatriate footballers
Naturalized citizens of Chile
Peruvian emigrants to Chile
Chilean footballers
Chile international footballers
Club Universitario de Deportes footballers
Deportivo Municipal footballers
Universidad de Chile footballers
Boca Juniors footballers
Badminton F.C. footballers
Peruvian Primera División players
Chilean Primera División players
Expatriate footballers in Chile
Peruvian expatriate sportspeople in Chile
Expatriate footballers in Argentina
Peruvian expatriate sportspeople in Argentina
Chilean expatriate sportspeople in Argentina
Association football forwards
Chilean people of Peruvian descent